Oued Endja District is a district of Mila Province, Algeria.

The district is further divided into 3 municipalities:
Oued Endja
Zeghaia
Ahmed Rachedi

Districts of Mila Province